Nommo is an African-American political, cultural, and news magazine. It is a quarterly student publication based at the University of California, Los Angeles. Founded by Lance Williams, Nommo published its first issue on December 4, 1968. It is " ... the nation’s oldest ethnic publication on a college campus." Editors have included Wanuri Kahiu, Lisa Smith-Young and M. K. Asante, Jr.

The name "Nommo" means “power of the word” in Swahili. It also refers to the Dogon ancestral spirits the Nommo. A number of other magazines use the name Nommo as well, including ones published at Oberlin, (Georgia), Nashville, Saginaw, Heidelberg, and Paris.

References

External links
 Nommo
 WorldCat

African-American magazines
Magazines established in 1968
Magazines published in Los Angeles
News magazines published in the United States
Student magazines published in the United States
Quarterly magazines published in the United States
University of California, Los Angeles